The Innocents of Chicago is a 1932 British comedy film directed by Lupino Lane and starring Henry Kendall, Binnie Barnes and Margot Grahame.

Production
The film was made by British International Pictures at Elstree Studios. It was based on the play The Milky Way. The film's sets were designed by art director Duncan Sutherland.

Cast
 Henry Kendall as Percy Lloyd  
 Betty Norton as Betty Woods  
 Margot Grahame as Lil  
 Bernard Nedell as Tony Costello  
 Binnie Barnes as Peg Guinan 
 Ben Welden as Spike Guinan 
 Wallace Lupino as Gangster 
 Charles Farrell as Smiler  
 Cyril Smith as Gangster 
 Ernest Sefton as Gangster  
 Val Guest as Gangster

References

Bibliography
Low, Rachael. Filmmaking in 1930s Britain. George Allen & Unwin, 1985.
Wood, Linda. British Films, 1927–1939. British Film Institute, 1986.

External links

1932 films
British comedy films
British black-and-white films
1932 comedy films
Films directed by Lupino Lane
British films based on plays
Films shot at British International Pictures Studios
1930s English-language films
1930s British films